Khan Kandi (also Romanized as Khān Kandī) is a village in Ojarud-e Gharbi Rural District, in the Central District of Germi County, Ardabil Province, Iran. At the 2006 census, its population was 18, in 7 families.  It is close to the border of Iran and Azerbaijan.

Geography
Khan Kandi lies at latitude 38.55 degrees North and 48.03 East.

Climate
Khan Kandi village has a cool mountain climate in the summer and is cold and extremely snowy in the winter. The average maximum temperature in July is up to 24 degrees Celsius, while its average temperature decreases to -7 degrees Celsius in January and February. The most average rainfall in October is 68 mm and the lowest average rainfall in July is 3 mm. This climatic and topographical position, unique climate and climate of the countryside have caused most of its inhabitants to be pleasant from mid-spring and in the warm months of the year, especially in August and September, from the cool and pleasant climate of the village. To take. Most people live in other parts of the year to carry out their economic activities and earn money in distant cities such as Tehran, Ardebil and Germi.

History
Khan Kandi was founded simultaneously with the village of Toulon and was an original cornerstone during the rule of Nadir Shah.

Population
In the not too distant past Khan Kandi had 15 households with a population of over 150 people but due to migration to cities the village is down to five households and a population of less than 50 people.

Economy and jobs
The main occupation of villagers is in animal husbandry, beekeeping and agriculture.

Fauna
A variety of animal life can be found in the mountains and meadows surrounding Khankandi.

Gallery

References

External links 

  khankandi Tourist Village
 http://www.khankandi.mihanblog.com/
 http://www.khankandi.persiangig.com/

Populated places in Germi County